The Nevada Copper Belt Railroad was a railroad in the state of Nevada connecting Nevada-Douglas Copper Company mining facilities to the Southern Pacific's former Carson and Colorado Railway subsidiary at Wabuska, Nevada. The railroad was built south from Wabuska to the Walker River at Mason, Nevada in 1910, and began operations on 1 March. Railroad construction then proceeded up the West Walker River canyon from Mason to leave the river at Hudson reaching the Nevada-Douglas Copper Company mine at Ludwig on 1 November 1911. Agricultural products from irrigated ranches along the Walker River provided revenues in addition to the ore traffic.

Decline
The railroad went into receivership in 1925, but traffic volume remained high until the Thompson smelter closed in 1929. The line from Hudson to Ludwig was abandoned when the Standard Gypsum Plaster plant closed in 1932. As trucks began hauling agricultural products, the railroad ceased passenger operations in 1945 and abandoned all operations in 1947.

Motive power roster

References

Defunct Nevada railroads
History of Lyon County, Nevada
Railway companies established in 1910
Railway companies disestablished in 1947
1910 establishments in Nevada
1947 disestablishments in Nevada